Piruana is a genus of longhorn beetles of the subfamily Lamiinae, containing the following species:

 Piruana pulchra Martins, Galileo & de Oliveira, 2009
 Piruana tuberosa Galileo & Martins, 1998

References

Desmiphorini